Ingvar Jónsson (born 18 October 1989) is an Icelandic football goalkeeper who plays for Víkingur Reykjavík and the Iceland national team. He made his senior debut in 2014, earning 8 caps for Iceland and was selected for Euro 2016 as an unused member.

Club career
Ingvar started his career with local club Njarðvík before moving to Stjarnan in the Úrvalsdeild before the 2011 season. With Stjarnan he won the 2014 Úrvalsdeild and was after the season voted by his fellow players the best player of the 2014 Úrvalsdeild. Stjarnan also had a good Europa League run in 2014, advancing past Bangor City, Motherwell and Lech Poznań before losing to Inter Milan in the play-off round.

In 2015, he joined IK Start, but could not secure the first spot in competition with Håkon Opdal. In the summer transfer window, he thus joined Sandnes Ulf on loan.

After one and a half year at Danish club Viborg IF, Jónsson left the club at the end of 2019.

On the 18th of January 2020 it was announced that Ingvar Jónsson would join Víkingur, signing a three-year contract.

International career
Ingvar made his first international appearance on 12 November 2014 in a match against Belgium, when he came on as a substitute for Ögmundur Kristinsson at half-time.

He was selected for EURO 2016.

Honours
Stjarnan
 Úrvalsdeild: 2014

Víkingur FC
Icelandic Premier Division: 2021

References

External links

1989 births
Living people
Association football goalkeepers
Ingvar Jonsson
Ingvar Jonsson
Ingvar Jonsson
Ingvar Jonsson
Ingvar Jonsson
Ingvar Jonsson
Ingvar Jonsson
IK Start players
Sandnes Ulf players
Sandefjord Fotball players
Ingvar Jonsson
Viborg FF players
Eliteserien players
Ingvar Jonsson
Norwegian First Division players
Danish 1st Division players
Ingvar Jonsson
Ingvar Jonsson
Expatriate footballers in Norway
Expatriate men's footballers in Denmark
UEFA Euro 2016 players